Meadowbrook High School is a public high school in Byesville, Ohio, United States.  It is the only high school in the Rolling Hills Local School District. Athletic teams compete as the Meadowbrook Colts in the Ohio High School Athletic Association as a member of the Muskingum Valley League.

OHSAA State Championships 
Girls Basketball - 1989

Notable alumni
Dom Capers - current Defensive Coordinator of the Green Bay Packers; former head coach of the Carolina Panthers and the Houston Texans
Rex M. Rogers - university president, author
Josh Sills - American football offensive guard for the Philadelphia Eagles of the National Football League (NFL)

References

External links
 District Website
 School Website

High schools in Guernsey County, Ohio
Public high schools in Ohio